Street Life: 20 Great Hits is a greatest hits album by Bryan Ferry and Roxy Music, released on 14 April 1986 by E'G Records. The album reached number one on both the New Zealand and UK Albums Charts in 1986.

Material from Roxy Music, Country Life and In Your Mind were not included.

Track listing

Charts

Weekly charts

Year-end charts

Certifications

References

Bibliography

 

1986 greatest hits albums
Bryan Ferry albums
E.G. Records compilation albums
Roxy Music compilation albums